James Martin (1924 – 14 February 2000) was an Irish professional golfer who enjoyed three victories on the British circuit in the 1960s, including the Piccadilly Medal in 1964 and the Carroll's International in 1968.

Martin was born in Wicklow. His father was the professional at Greystones Golf Club. He was selected to represent Ireland at five World Cups between 1962 and 1970, and also to represent Great Britain in the Ryder Cup at Royal Birkdale in 1965, where he would play in - and lose - one foursomes match, in partnership with Jimmy Hitchcock, to Julius Boros and Tony Lema.

Martin died on 14 February 2000 at St. Columcille's Hospital in Loughlinstown, Dublin, Ireland aged 75.

Professional wins (7)
This list is probably incomplete

1954 Coombe Hill Assistants' Tournament
1964 Blaxnit (Ulster) Tournament, Piccadilly Medal
1965 Silentnight Tournament (tie with Dave Thomas)
1968 Carroll's International
1969 Irish PGA Championship
1970 Turnberry-B.O.A.C. Foursomes Tournament (with Roddy Carr)

Results in major championships

Note: Martin only played in The Open Championship.

CUT = missed the half-way cut (3rd round cut in 1969 and 1974 Open Championships)
"T" indicates a tie for a place

Team appearances
World Cup (representing Ireland): 1962, 1963, 1964, 1966, 1970
Ryder Cup (representing Great Britain): 1965

References

Alliss, Peter: "The Who's Who of Golf" (1983), Orbis Publishing Ltd. .

Irish male golfers
Ryder Cup competitors for Europe
People from Wicklow (town)
1924 births
2000 deaths